Turiaf may refer to:

 Ronny Turiaf (born 1983), French former professional basketball player 
 Turiaf of Dol (died c. 750), Breton abbot and priest